The Grand Wheel is the eighth science fiction novel by Barrington J. Bayley. The novel follows Cheyne Scarne, a professor of "randomatics", as he is selected by the eponymous organization (which holds a galactic monopoly on games of chance) to represent humanity in a card game with infinitely varying rules. The name of the main character appears to be a reference to John Scarne.

Literary significance and reception
Rhys Hughes, in his survey of Bayley's work, described The Grand Wheel as an "entertaining gambling novel" with a "seedy and elegant" atmosphere. Colin Greenland, writing in Foundation 18, received the novel negatively, saying that it had been produced for the market and "would have been old in 1957".

References

1977 British novels
1977 science fiction novels
Novels by Barrington J. Bayley
DAW Books books
English science fiction novels